Real is the fourth studio album by American musician Lydia Loveless. It was released on August 19, 2016 by Bloodshot Records.

Background 
The record is a continued collaboration (after two records and one EP) between Loveless and engineer Joe Viers, who recorded the record at Viers' Grove City, Ohio Sonic Lounge Studios.

Critical reception
Real was featured as part of NPR Music's First Listen series.

Writing for Exclaim!, Sarah Green hailed Loveless' "flickering, torchy voice".

Accolades

Track listing

References

Lydia Loveless albums
Bloodshot Records albums
2016 albums